Andrei Vitalyevich Fyodorov or Fedorov (born 10 April 1971) is a football coach and a former defender. Fyodorov is a former Uzbekistani international. He is a naturalized Russian citizen.

Playing career
He started his professional career in Soviet Second League club Avtomobilist Kokand. In 1992–1995 he played for Neftchi Farg'ona and won 4 Uzbek League champion titles.
After playing for Alania Vladikavkaz in 1998–1999 and Baltika he moved to Rubin Kazan. Fyodorov played for Rubin in 2000–2008. In 2008, he won Russian Premier League with Rubin.

International
He was member of Uzbekistan team participating in 1994 Asian Games in Hiroshima. Uzbekistan won 1994 Asian Games. Fyodorov capped 64 matches for national, scoring 7 goals.

Managing career
He finished playing career in Rubin and in 2008 was selected as director of club's scouting department. In 2012–2013 he was head coach of Rubin reserve squad.
In 2014, he moved to Neftchi Farg'ona and joined club's coaching stuff as assistant coach.  After Murod Ismoilov resigned Fyodorov was appointed as head coach on 15 September 2015.

On 13 October 2022, Fyodorov was appointed caretaker manager of Lokomotiv Moscow. His caretaking spell ended on 13 November 2022 with the hiring of Mikhail Galaktionov. Lokomotiv won one league game out of 5 that Fyodorov managed.

Honours

Club
Neftchi
 Uzbek League (4): 1992, 1993, 1994, 1995
 Uzbek League runners-up (2): 1996, 1997
 Uzbek Cup (2): 1994, 1996

Rubin
 Russian Football National League (1): 2002
 Russian Premier League (1): 2008

National team
 Asian Games (1) 1994

Individual
 Uzbekistan Coach of the Year 3rd (1): 1997

Career statistics

Club
Last update: 29 November 2008

International goals

References

External links

Profile at FIFA.com
 Profile at rubin-kazan.ru

1971 births
Living people
FC Spartak Vladikavkaz players
FC Rubin Kazan players
FK Neftchi Farg'ona players
FC Baltika Kaliningrad players
Russian Premier League players
Soviet footballers
Uzbekistani footballers
Uzbekistani expatriate footballers
Uzbekistan international footballers
1996 AFC Asian Cup players
2000 AFC Asian Cup players
2004 AFC Asian Cup players
People from Fergana
Uzbekistani people of Russian descent
Footballers at the 1994 Asian Games
Footballers at the 1998 Asian Games
Naturalised citizens of Russia
Association football defenders
Asian Games gold medalists for Uzbekistan
Asian Games medalists in football
Medalists at the 1994 Asian Games
Uzbekistani expatriate sportspeople in Russia
Uzbekistani football managers
FC Lokomotiv Moscow managers
FC Neftchi Farg'ona managers
Russian Premier League managers